Rosie Perez (born Rosa Maria Perez on September 6, 1964) is an American actress, choreographer, dancer, and activist. Her breakthrough came with her portrayal of Tina in the film Do the Right Thing (1989), followed by White Men Can't Jump (1992). Perez's performance in Fearless (1993) earned her a nomination for the Academy Award for Best Supporting Actress, among other accolades. Her starring film roles since include It Could Happen to You (1994), The Road to El Dorado (2000), Pineapple Express (2008), and Birds of Prey (2020).

Perez earned three Primetime Emmy Award nominations for In Living Color (1990–1994) and another Emmy nomination for her work in The Flight Attendant (2020–present). She has performed in stage plays on Broadway such as The Ritz, Frankie and Johnny in the Clair de Lune, and Fish in the Dark. She was also a co-host on the ABC talk show The View during the series' 18th season.

Early life 
Perez was born on September 6, 1964, in the Bushwick neighborhood of Brooklyn, New York City, to Lydia Pérez and Ismael Serrano, a merchant marine seaman. Her mother Lydia (née Fontañez y Reyes) was born October 13, 1939, in Humacao, Puerto Rico. Her father was from Aguadilla, Puerto Rico. Her mother was married to a man 20 years her senior, Arturo Pérez. Her mother already had five children when she became pregnant with Rosie after having an affair with Serrano. Perez was born at the now-closed Greenpoint Hospital in the Greenpoint neighborhood of Brooklyn.

Perez is one of ten children borne by her mother. Rosie and her siblings grew up in Bushwick while their mother was intermittently jailed. Her mother gave birth to her youngest child while incarcerated. She was for a time raised by an aunt and then, like her siblings, went through group homes and foster care. She and her siblings were often split up. She was transferred to a group foster home and lived in foster care in New York and Peekskill until age eight. She was legally considered a ward of the State of New York until age twelve. Her mother and aunt frequently visited, and her father made an unsuccessful custody bid at one point.

When she was in third grade, Perez learned that she had a speech impediment. She had a strict Catholic upbringing, which she has credited to the influence of the nuns during her childhood. She eventually moved in with her paternal aunt, Ana Dominga Otero Serrano-Roque.

She attended Grover Cleveland High School, in the Ridgewood neighborhood of Queens. By 1999, her mother was living in poverty in the Woodside Houses, when she died of AIDS-related complications.

Career 

At 19 years old, Perez started her career in the early 1980s as a dancer on Soul Train. As a student at Los Angeles City College, with plans to major in biochemistry, she said she relieved stress by going to nightclubs for ladies' night. A talent scout from Soul Train asked Perez to appear on the show. She was not a professional dancer, but loved it so much she dropped out of school. In 1988, when she was 24 years old, Perez was noticed at the dance club Funky Reggae by Spike Lee, who hired her for her first major acting role in Do the Right Thing.

Perez later choreographed music videos by Janet Jackson, Bobby Brown, Diana Ross, LL Cool J and The Boys. She was the choreographer for the dancing group the Fly Girls who were featured on the Fox television comedy program In Living Color and also worked as a segment producer. She made her Broadway debut in Terrence McNally's Frankie and Johnny in the Clair de Lune. Perez had her third major role in the hit comedy White Men Can't Jump co-starring Wesley Snipes and Woody Harrelson.

Perez was nominated for the Oscar for Best Supporting Actress for her role in Peter Weir's 1993 film Fearless. She attended the ceremony with her father. In 1997, she co-starred with Javier Bardem in Perdita Durango, a film in which many scenes of excessive violence, sex and nudity were edited out of the version released in the United States but remained intact in the version released throughout Latin America. In 1999, Perez starred in Nancy Savoca's The 24 Hour Woman. She provides the voices of Click, the camera, on Nick Jr.'s Go, Diego, Go! and Chel, a beautiful native woman in the DreamWorks Animation film The Road to El Dorado. She played corrupt police officer Carol Brazier in the Judd Apatow-produced film Pineapple Express, co-starring Seth Rogen and James Franco.

Perez appeared on an episode of Law & Order: Special Victims Unit in October 2009 about pedophiles' rights. Executive producer Neal Baer said the writers had Perez in mind when they wrote the role of a young sexual abuse victim's mother. She injured her neck while filming the episode and underwent surgery to heal a herniated disc. One year after the accident, she appeared at the White House in a wheelchair, wearing a neck brace for a meeting with President Obama. In May 2011, Perez filed a lawsuit against the producers of the show, saying the injury she incurred was the result of being "recklessly pulled, grabbed, yanked, wrenched and manhandled" during filming.

In June 2013, she served as the grand marshal for the international Boxing Hall of Fame parade in Canastota, New York. In February 2014, Perez published an autobiography titled Handbook for an Unpredictable Life: How I Survived Sister Renata and My Crazy Mother, and Still Came Out Smiling... She is also the reader of the audio CD of this book. Perez said that she did not initially set out to write an autobiography, but rather a book that analyzes the causes and effects of child abuse. She said it was not until about 6 months after the book was published and she heard responses from others that she found the experience cathartic.

On September 3 of the same year, ABC announced Perez would join The View as a new co-host alongside moderator Whoopi Goldberg, newcomer Nicolle Wallace, and returning co-host Rosie O'Donnell. The new season began on September 15, 2014. Perez said she was initially hesitant about the job because "I didn't want to be on a show where people were just screaming at each other disrespectfully." She decided to join the cast when she learned that Bill Wolff, whom she knew from The Rachel Maddow Show, was going to be the new executive producer. In 2015, she returned to Broadway to star in Fish in the Dark, a play written by Larry David. On July 8, 2015, Perez announced she would be leaving The View.

In 2018, in a series regular role, Perez portrayed Tracey Wolfe in the NBC musical drama television series Rise, which ran for one season. She starred in the 2020 superhero film Birds of Prey, as the DC Entertainment superhero Renee Montoya / Question. Later that year, Perez starred in the comedy-drama series The Flight Attendant. She earned a Primetime Emmy Award nomination for Outstanding Supporting Actress in a Comedy Series for the role.

In 2021 Perez starred in the film adaptation of the children's book series Clifford the Big Red Dog.

Activism 
Perez is an activist for Puerto Rican rights:
 Her film Yo soy Boricua, pa'que tu lo sepas! (I'm Puerto Rican, Just So You Know!) documents her activism.
 She starred in and directed the Spanish AIDS PSA campaign "Join the Fight" for Cable Positive and Kismet Films. The campaign featured actor Wilmer Valderrama, BET's Julissa Bermudez, Telenovela actor Erick Elías, singer/actress Lorena Rojas, 2006–2007 Miss Universe Zuleyka Rivera and actress Judy Marte. An English-language campaign was also directed by Liev Schreiber.
 US President Barack Obama appointed her to The Presidential Advisory Council on HIV/AIDS (PACHA). She was sworn in on February 2, 2010.
 On January 6, 2000, she was arrested for disorderly conduct in Manhattan following a rally to protest against the U.S. Navy air weapons training, as well as other forms of payload on the government training range owned at Vieques, an island off the coast of Puerto Rico.
 Perez serves as the chair of the artistic board for Urban Arts Partnership, a New York City arts education nonprofit that uses arts integrated education programs to close the achievement gap.

Personal life 
Perez suffered abuse during her childhood along with her siblings from her mother, as well as regular beatings from a nun, Sister Bernarda, according to a May 2022 interview with Terry Gross on NPR's "Fresh Air". As a result, she has suffered from high anxiety, PTSD, and depression but with therapy it has been greatly reduced.

Perez married filmmaker and playwright Seth Zvi Rosenfeld in 1998. The couple divorced in 2001 after ten years together. She married artist Eric Haze on September 15, 2013, in Las Vegas. They had decided to get married the night before, while attending the Floyd Mayweather vs. Saúl Álvarez boxing match. They got married the following morning. They live in Clinton Hill, Brooklyn. 

Perez stated on the Pineapple Express DVD commentary that she is allergic to dairy products. She was a friend of the late rapper and actor Tupac Shakur.

Filmography

Film

Television

Theatre

Awards and nominations 

(2021) NHMC Impact Awards (Outstanding Performance in a Series)

Published works

References

External links 

 
 
 
 

1964 births
Living people
Activists from New York (state)
Actresses from New York City
American actresses of Puerto Rican descent
American choreographers
American film actresses
American health activists
American stage actresses
American television actresses
American voice actresses
Hispanic and Latino American actresses
HIV/AIDS activists
People from Bushwick, Brooklyn
People from Clinton Hill, Brooklyn
Theatre World Award winners
20th-century American actresses
21st-century American actresses